The BMW 321 is a compact six-cylinder automobile produced by the Bavarian firm between 1938 and 1941. After 1945, production of the 321 resumed at the Eisenach plant and continued until 1950.

The launch
The 321 was introduced at the start of 1939 as a successor to the BMW 320. It sat on a shortened version of the BMW 326 chassis. The 321 differed from the 320 in its front suspension, its larger tyres, and its styling. While the 320 used front suspension derived from the BMW 303, with a high mounted transverse leaf spring and lower control arms, the 321 used the front suspension from the 326, with upper control arms and a low mounted transverse leaf spring.

Body options
The car was available both as a two-door sedan and as a two-door cabriolet. In addition, BMW offered a chassis-only option suitable for a coach-built body.

Engine and transmission
The four-speed manual gear box was also the one already seen on the 326.

Commercial
Two years after the introduction of the 321, in 1941, automobile production at the Eisenach plant was suspended in favour of war production. By then, 3,814 had been built.

Production after World War II

In 1945, Eisenach was occupied by American forces, but by then it had already been agreed between the allies that the whole of Thuringia would fall within the Soviet occupation zone: transfer of the region to the Soviets took place in July 1945. It seemed likely that BMW's manufacturing facility would be crated up and taken by rail to the Soviet Union as part of the substantial post war reparations package. In the meantime, surviving workers returning from the war recommenced automobile production, on a very small scale, using prewar designs. Albert Seidler, the man in charge of Eisenach motor bike production, demonstrated the 321 to Marshal Zhukov and secured from him an order for five new cars. The Russians were evidently impressed, and the plant passed under the control of “Sowjetische AG Maschinenbau Awtowelo”, a Soviet directed holding company focused on vehicle production. A further 8,996 BMW 321s are thought to have been built between 1945 and 1950. Most appear to have remained to the east of the Iron Curtain, many being taken to the Soviet Union as part of a reparations package in respect of the Second World War. Evidence also exists for exports to the west: the car was advertised in Switzerland in 1949 with a retail price of CHF 10,300.

References

321
Executive cars
Rear-wheel-drive vehicles
1940s cars
Cars introduced in 1938
Compact executive cars
Convertibles
Sedans

de:BMW 320#BMW 321